Hammond Academy may refer to:

 Hammond School (South Carolina), formerly known as Hammond Academy
 Hammond Academy of Science and Technology in Hammond, Indiana